The Embassy of Belgium in Moscow is the diplomatic mission of Belgium in Russia. It is located at 7 Malaya Molchanovka Street in the Arbat District of Moscow.

See also 
 Belgium–Russia relations
 Diplomatic missions in Russia

References

External links 
  Embassy of Belgium in Moscow

Belgium
Moscow
Belgium–Russia relations
Arbat District